Van Leer is a surname of Dutch and German origin. It is a variant of the ancient surname Valär. Notable people with this surname include:

 Florence Van Leer Earle Coates (1850–1927), American poet
 Antoinette Van Leer Polk (1847–1919), American Southern belle and Baroness de Charette
 Maryly Van Leer Peck (1930–2011), American academic and president of Polk Community College, Winter Haven, Florida
 Carlos Clark Van Leer (1865–1953), military officer
 Anthony Wayne Van Leer (1783–1864), prominent iron works owner in Tennessee
 Benjamin van Leer (born 1992), Dutch professional footballer
 Bernardhus Van Leer (1687–1790), was one of the first doctors in New York
 Blake Ragsdale Van Leer (1893–1956), president of Georgia Institute of Technology
 Blake Wayne Van Leer (1926-1997), Captain and Commander in the U.S. Navy.
 Bram van Leer (fl. 1970–2012), Dutch-American professor emeritus of aerospace engineering at the University of Michigan
 Carlos Clark Van Leer (1865-1953), Captain in the U.S. Army and Chief of Personnel in U.S. Department of Treasury 
 David Van Leer (1949–2013), American educator, author and cultural studies researcher
 Ella Lillian Wall Van Leer (1892–1986), American artist, architect and women's rights activist
 Isaac Van Leer (1772–1821) prominent iron works owner in Pennsylvania 
 Jean Van Leer (1919-2003), Belgian field hockey player who competed in the Olympics
 John P. Van Leer (1825-1862), United States military officer
 Lia van Leer (1924–2015), film archive pioneer in Israel
 Samuel Van Leer, (1747–1825) ironmaster and captain in the American Revolutionary War
 Thijs van Leer (born 1948), Dutch musician

Given name
 VanLeer Polk (1856-1907), Tennessee State Senator and diplomat

See also
 Van Leer (disambiguation)
 Van Lear (disambiguation)
Van Leer Family

Surnames of Dutch origin
Dutch-language surnames
Surnames of German origin
Swiss-German surnames
Surnames of Swiss origin
Van Leer family